Shiva Chandra Jha was an Indian politician belonging to the Samyukta Socialist Party. He was elected to the lower House of the Indian Parliament the Lok Sabha from Madhubani in Bihar.

References

External links
Official biographical sketch in Parliament of India website

India MPs 1967–1970
Lok Sabha members from Bihar
Samyukta Socialist Party politicians
1929 births
Living people